Wan Azwari bin Wan Nor (born 8 June 1986) is a Malaysian footballer who plays as a defender for Terengganu City in Malaysia FAM League. He also known as Gaban among team mate. He is elders brother of Felda United player Wan Zack Haikal Wan Noor.

References

1986 births
Living people
Malaysian footballers
Sri Pahang FC players
Perak F.C. players
Sabah F.C. (Malaysia) players
Melaka United F.C. players
People from Pahang
Malaysia Super League players
Association football fullbacks